Triorla is a genus of robber flies in the family Asilidae. There are about five described species in Triorla.

Species
These five species belong to the genus Triorla:
 Triorla interrupta (Macquart, 1834) i c g b
 Triorla parastriola Pamplona & de Cima Aires, 1999 c g
 Triorla spinosa Tomasovic, 2002 c g
 Triorla striola (Fabricius, 1805) c g
 Triorla trichinus Tomasovic, 2002 c g
Data sources: i = ITIS, c = Catalogue of Life, g = GBIF, b = Bugguide.net

References

Further reading

External links

 

Asilidae
Articles created by Qbugbot
Asilidae genera